Ali Keïta (born 1 October 1988) is an Ivorian footballer who plays as a left-back.

Career
He left US Concarneau in 2017, and previously made 25 appearances in Ligue 2 for Brest.

On 24 October 2019, Keïta joined Championnat National 2 club SC Bastia. One month later the club announced, that Keïta had left the club by mutual agreement. In the summer 2020, Keïta joined FC Martigues.

References

1988 births
Living people
Footballers from Abidjan
Ivorian footballers
Association football defenders
AFC Compiègne players
La Vitréenne FC players
US Avranches players
Luçon FC players
Stade Brestois 29 players
US Concarneau players
Le Mans FC players
SC Bastia players
FC Martigues players
Ligue 2 players
Championnat National players
Championnat National 2 players